Taco soup is a type of soup composed of similar ingredients to those used inside a taco: ground beef, tomatoes, chopped green chilis, onions, corn, beans and a packet of taco seasoning. Vegetarian versions combine beans with the other ingredients, except for the ground beef. Once cooked, the soup may be topped off with cheese, sour cream, raw onions, avocado, or tortilla chips

Taco soup is a healthy dish and is a popular recipe for Taco Tuesday. Taco soup can be made on the stove top or in an electric pressure cooker.  Instant Pot Chicken Taco Soup has become a popular recipe due to its low carb and high protein content.

See also
 Taco
 Tortilla soup
 List of soups

References

Soups
Beef dishes
Spicy foods
Maize dishes
Legume dishes
Tomato dishes
Taco
Mexican-American cuisine